Alucita iranensis is a moth of the family Alucitidae. It is found in Iran.

References

Moths described in 1994
Alucitidae
Moths of the Middle East